The Katcef Archeological Site is an archaeological site near Crofton in Anne Arundel County, Maryland. It is a series of overlapping base camp sites dating from the Clovis phase of the Paleoindian period, through to the Late Woodland period. The primary era of site utilization was during the Late Archaic period.

It was listed on the National Register of Historic Places in 1991.

References

External links
, including photo from 1990, at Maryland Historical Trust

Archaic period in North America
Native American history of Maryland
Pre-Columbian archaeological sites
Archaeological sites on the National Register of Historic Places in Maryland
Archaeological sites in Anne Arundel County, Maryland
Late Woodland period
National Register of Historic Places in Anne Arundel County, Maryland